Quezon Avenue station is an elevated Manila Metro Rail Transit (MRT) station situated on Line 3. The station is located in Diliman in Quezon City and is named after Quezon Avenue, one of the major thoroughfares of Quezon City.

The station is the second station for trains headed to Taft Avenue and the twelfth station for trains headed to North Avenue.

Nearby landmarks
One of the well-known landmarks that can be seen from the station is the headquarters of ABS-CBN, one of the Philippines' media companies, located at Sergeant Esguerra Street, near Quezon Avenue. Quezon Memorial Circle and Triangle Park can also be accessed from this station where a few government buildings stand like the PAGASA Complex, Office of the Ombudsman, Court of Tax Appeals and the Lung Center of the Philippines. The station is directly linked to Centris Station and Centris Walk shopping centers within Eton Centris.

Transportation links
Buses, jeepneys and taxis can be used to navigate the area.

Operating Schedule

Express Train Service 
Note: This service was discontinued in 2014.

See also
List of rail transit stations in Metro Manila
Manila Metro Rail Transit System Line 3

Manila Metro Rail Transit System stations
Railway stations opened in 1999
Buildings and structures in Quezon City
1999 establishments in the Philippines